Shungite is a black and lustrous mineraloid that was first described from a deposit near Shunga village, in Karelia, Russia, from where it gets its name. Shungite can be low-carbon (5% C), medium-carbon (5-25% C) and high-carbon (25-80% C) percent by weight of carbon and the carbon base of shungite is a multilayered fullerene-like globule with a diameter of 10-30 nm.  Shungite has been reported to contain trace amounts of fullerenes (0.0001 < 0.001%).

Terminology
The term "shungite" was originally used in 1879 to describe a mineraloid with more than 98 per cent carbon. More recently the term has also been used to describe shungite-bearing rocks, leading to some confusion. Shungite-bearing rocks have also been classified purely on their carbon content, with shungite-1 having a carbon content in the range 98-100 weight per cent and shungite-2, -3, -4 and -5 having contents in the ranges 35-80 per cent, 20-35 per cent, 10-20 per cent and less than 10 per cent, respectively. In a further classification, shungite is subdivided into bright, semi-bright, semi-dull and dull on the basis of their luster (the terms lustrous and matte are also used for bright and dull).

Shungite has two main modes of occurrence, disseminated within the host rock and as apparently mobilised material. Migrated shungite, which is bright (lustrous) shungite, has been interpreted to represent migrated hydrocarbons and is found as either layer shungite, layers or lenses near conformable with the host rock layering, or vein shungite, which is found as cross-cutting veins. Shungite may also occur as clasts within younger sedimentary rocks.

Occurrence
Shungite has to date mainly been found in Russia. The main deposit is in the Lake Onega area of Karelia, at Zazhoginskoye, near Shunga, with another occurrence at Vozhmozero. Two other much smaller occurrences have been reported in Russia, one in Kamchatka in volcanic rocks and the other formed by the burning of spoil from a coal mine at high temperature in Chelyabinsk. Other occurrences have been described from Austria, India, Democratic Republic of Congo and Kazakhstan.

Formation

Shungite has been regarded as an example of abiogenic petroleum formation, but its biological origin has now been confirmed. Non-migrated shungite is found directly stratigraphically above deposits that were formed in a shallow water carbonate shelf to non-marine evaporitic environment. The shungite bearing sequence is thought to have been deposited during active rifting, consistent with the alkaline volcanic rocks that are found within the sequence. The organic-rich sediments were probably deposited in a brackish lagoonal setting. The concentration of carbon indicates elevated biological productivity levels, possibly due to high levels of nutrients available from interbedded volcanic material.

The stratified shungite-bearing deposits that retain sedimentary structures are interpreted as metamorphosed oil source rocks. Some diapiric mushroom-shaped structures have been identified, which are interpreted as possible mud volcanoes. Layer and vein shungite varieties, and shungite filling vesicles and forming the matrix to breccias, are interpreted as migrated petroleum, now in the form of metamorphosed bitumen.

Shunga deposit
The Shunga deposit contains an estimated total carbon reserve of more than 250 gigatonnes. It is found within a sequence of Palaeoproterozoic metasedimentary and metavolcanic rocks that are preserved in a synform. The sequence is dated by a gabbro intrusion, which gives a date of 1980±27 Ma, and the underlying dolomites, which give an age of 2090±70 Ma. There are nine shungite-bearing layers within the Zaonezhskaya Formation, from the middle of the preserved sequence. Of these the thickest is layer six, which is also known as the "Productive horizon", due to its concentration of shungite deposits. Four main deposits are known from the area, the Shungskoe, Maksovo, Zazhogino and Nigozero deposits. The Shungskoe deposit is the most studied and is mainly mined out.

Uses
Amongst ancient cultures, shungite was said to be used to treat allergies, skin diseases, diabetes mellitus, stomatitis, periodontal disease, hair loss, cosmetic flaws, and many other diseases.

Shungite has been used as a folk medical treatment since the early 18th century. Peter the Great set up Russia's first spa in Karelia to make use of the water purifying properties of shungite, which he had himself experienced. He also instigated its use in providing purified water for the Russian army.

The antibacterial properties of shungite have been confirmed by testing. These are possibly due to the extremely high heavy metal content of the mineral. Shungite exhibits antioxidant properties, but only at about 1000 times less activity than quercetin, for example. In 2017, research suggests that a fullerene-based compound within shungite has an antioxidant and anti-inflammatory action against UVB-induced skin damage.

Shungite has been used since the middle of the 18th century as a pigment for paint, and is currently sold under the names "carbon black" or "shungite natural black".

In the 1970s, shungite was exploited in the production of an insulating material, known as shungisite. Shungisite is prepared by heating rocks with low shungite concentrations to 1090–1130 °C and is used as a low density filler. Shungite has applications in construction technologies.

Crystal healing pseudoscience proponents and 5G conspiracy theorists have falsely alleged the misinformational belief that shungite may remove 5G radiation from their vicinity more efficiently than any material of similar electrical conductivity would do.

References

Organic minerals
Minerals
Geology of Russia
Karelia
Quantum mysticism